The 1997–98 Argentine Torneo Argentino A was the third season of third division professional football in Argentina. A total of 16 teams competed; the champions were promoted to Primera B Nacional.

Club information

Zone A

Zone B

Teams from Argentino B that played the Final Stage

First stage

Zone A

Zone B

Final stage

Zone A

Zone B

Relegation Playoffs

Semifinals

Liniers (BB) remains in Torneo Argentino B.

Deportivo Patagones abandoned the competition and was relegated to 1998–99 Torneo Argentino B. The match was awarded 1-0 to Ñuñorco.

Final

Ñuñorco was promoted to 1998–99 Torneo Argentino A by winning the playoff and Concepción FC was relegated to 1998–99 Torneo Argentino B.

See also
1997–98 in Argentine football

References

Torneo Argentino A seasons
3